William "Dynamite" Douglas (21 March 1940 – 7 October 1999) was an American boxer. His son is former world heavyweight champion, James "Buster" Douglas.

A native of Columbus, Ohio, Douglas was a contender in the middleweight and light-heavyweight divisions during the 1970s, fighting such opponents as Bennie Briscoe, Marvin Johnson and Matthew Saad Muhammad. He retired in 1980 with a record of 41-16-1.

Douglas was trained by fellow Ohio native Gary H. Brown, who is a former professional boxer.

Professional boxing record

References

External links
 

|-

1940 births
1999 deaths
Boxers from Columbus, Ohio
Middleweight boxers
Light-heavyweight boxers
American male boxers
African-American boxers
20th-century African-American sportspeople